Dilbert is an American comic strip.

Dilbert may also refer to:

Dilbert (character), the title character of the comic strip
Dilbert (TV series), a television series based on the comic strip
Dilbert principle, a 1990s satirical observation stating that companies tend to systematically promote their least-competent employees to management, in order to limit the amount of damage that they're capable of doing

See also
Dilbert Groundloop, a World War II-era cartoon character who is a bumbling navy pilot
Dilbert Dunker, a device for training air pilots to escape a submerged plane